Cuindles was the 17th abbot of Clonmacnoise. He died in 724.

Cuindles was a member of the Soghain of Connacht. He had succeeded to his position in 713. In 723, a fire destroyed the monastery buildings. 

His memorial slab still exists, bearing the inscription "" ('A prayer for Cuindles').

References

 The Abbatial Succession at Clonmacnoise, p. 499, John Ryan, in Feil-Sgribhinn Eoin Mhic Neill, Dublin, 1938.

8th-century Irish abbots
Christian clergy from County Galway